Pablo Coira Lojo (born 18 October 1979) is a Spanish retired footballer who played mainly as a right back.

Football career
After starting playing professional football with local SD Compostela, in Segunda División, Coira joined Galicia giants Celta de Vigo in 1999, appearing sparingly throughout four La Liga seasons (maximum 18 league games in 2001–02). Shortly before joining Celta he represented Spain at the 1999 FIFA World Youth Championship, winning the tournament; also in the squad was teammate Pablo Couñago, who was crowned the competition's top scorer.

Subsequently, Coira had unassuming stints with Deportivo Alavés – playing no matches in his final year, which ended in top flight relegation, and being loaned to Recreativo de Huelva in between – and Greek club Aris Thessaloniki FC. He returned to Spain in January 2007 to play for lowly UE Figueres in Segunda División B, named UE Casteldefells shortly after.

In the 2008–09 campaign, Coira dropped down to Tercera División and joined RCD Espanyol's B-team. The following year he moved countries for the second time in his career, signing with Budapest Honvéd FC in Hungary, where he played most of the time as a central midfielder.

Honours

Club
Celta
UEFA Intertoto Cup: 2000

International
Spain U20
FIFA World Youth Championship: 1999

References

External links

Celta de Vigo biography 

1979 births
Living people
Spanish footballers
Footballers from Vilagarcía de Arousa
Association football defenders
Association football midfielders
La Liga players
Segunda División players
Segunda División B players
Tercera División players
SD Compostela footballers
Celta de Vigo B players
RC Celta de Vigo players
Deportivo Alavés players
Recreativo de Huelva players
UE Figueres footballers
RCD Espanyol B footballers
Super League Greece players
Aris Thessaloniki F.C. players
Nemzeti Bajnokság I players
Budapest Honvéd FC players
Spain youth international footballers
Spain under-21 international footballers
Spanish expatriate footballers
Expatriate footballers in Greece
Expatriate footballers in Hungary
Spanish expatriate sportspeople in Greece
Spanish expatriate sportspeople in Hungary